Silvestre Igoa Garciandia (5 September 1920 – 31 May 1969) was a Spanish footballer. He played for Spain in the 1950 FIFA World Cup, scoring two goals. He played for Valencia CF from 1941 to 1950.

International goals

Honours
Valencia CF
Spanish League: 1941–42, 1943–44, 1946–47
Spanish Cup: 1948–49
Copa Eva Duarte: 1949

External links
 
 National team data 
 Valencia CF profile 
 
 

1920 births
1969 deaths
Footballers from San Sebastián
Spanish footballers
Association football forwards
La Liga players
Valencia CF players
Real Sociedad footballers
Granada CF footballers
Spain B international footballers
Spain international footballers
1950 FIFA World Cup players